Stará Ves is a municipality and village in Bruntál District in the Moravian-Silesian Region of the Czech Republic. It has about 500 inhabitants.

Administrative parts
The village of Žďárský Potok is an administrative part of Stará Ves.

History
The first written mention of Stará Ves is from 1561.

References

Villages in Bruntál District